Cristina Danforth (Kwahlak^ni) is the Chairwoman of the Oneida Tribe of Indians of Wisconsin.

See also 

 Oneida people
 Oneida Indian Nation
 Oneida Nation of the Thames
 Six Nations of the Grand River

References 

Oneida people
People from Wisconsin
Living people
Year of birth missing (living people)